Larrabee Elementary School was retired as a K–5 school in June 2014. The building now houses the Bellingham Family Partnership Program, part of Bellingham Public Schools. Larrabee Elementary School is permanently closed.

History
Larrabee Elementary School was originally named Larrabee Grammar School built in 1890 at 21st and Larrabee Street, but was later relocated to a newly built location in 1920 with an additional gymnasium built in 1954. The school was named after Charles Xavier Larrabee, an early land developer in Fairhaven.

In 2010, Larrabee Elementary School was recognized by the Office of the Superintendent of Public Instruction a school of excellence.

See also
Bellingham School District 501
Charles Xavier Larrabee

References

External links
Bellingham School District Website
Family Partnership Program

Public elementary schools in Washington (state)
Educational institutions established in 1890
Schools in Bellingham, Washington
1890 establishments in Washington (state)
2014 disestablishments in Washington (state)
Educational institutions disestablished in 2014